Men in White (French: Les hommes en blanc) is a 1955 French drama film directed by Ralph Habib and starring Raymond Pellegrin, Jeanne Moreau and Jean Chevrier.

Plot summary

Cast

References

Bibliography 
 Crisp, C.G. The classic French cinema, 1930-1960. Indiana University Press, 1993

External links 
 
 

1955 films
1955 drama films
French drama films
1950s French-language films
Films directed by Ralph Habib
French black-and-white films
1950s French films